(born October 3, 1972) is a Japanese surfing and flight champion, actor and hip hop singer, under the stage name A.K.T.I.O.N., from Akasaka, Tokyo. He is the eldest son of actor and singer Mike Maki.

Biography
His height is 172 cm and his hobby is surfing. He made his television acting debut in 1987, after much work in theatre, in NHK's year-long Japanese period drama series Takeda Shingen. Also that year, he made his motion picture debut in Soul Music Lovers Only. In 1989, he was named Best Newcomer at the Japanese Academy Awards for his role in the film Buddies. In 1991 he portrayed the deaf-mute surfer Shigeru in Takeshi Kitano's third film A Scene at the Sea. He starred in Junji Sakamoto's Falling Angels in 1997, followed by four films in 1998 including Golden Wolf, Resurrection, and Beat.

As a rapper he is on the same label as Zeebra, Solomon i&i Production.

Filmography

Film

Television

References

External links
 Official profile 

1972 births
Living people
Japanese male film actors
Japanese male television actors
Japanese people of American descent
Japanese rappers
Male actors from Tokyo
People from Tachikawa
Singers from Tokyo
20th-century Japanese male actors
21st-century Japanese male actors
21st-century Japanese male singers
21st-century Japanese singers
21st-century rappers